The 2017–18 Qatari League, also known as Qatar Stars League, is the 45th edition of top-level football championship in Qatar.

Teams

Stadia and locations

Foreign players
The total number of foreign players is restricted to nine per club. Clubs can register up to four professional foreign players, of which a maximum of three are allowed from nations outside the Asian Football Confederation (AFC).

Players name in bold indicates the player is registered during the mid-season transfer window.

League table

Statistics

Top scorers

Team of the Year

References

External links
 

Qatar Stars League seasons
Qatar
2017–18 in Qatari football